The World League Wrestling (WLW) Ladies Championship, is the top title contested for women's professional wrestling wrestlers in the independent professional wrestling promotion World League Wrestling.

Current champion
The current champion is Miss Monica. She defeated Miss Natural and Stacy O'Brien in a triple threat match at Night Of Champions 2 in St Peters, Missouri to win the title on August 28, 2016.

Title history

List of top combined reigns

See also
Harley Race's Wrestling Academy

References
World League Wrestling's official site
WLW Ladies Championship history on CageMatch.de

Women's professional wrestling championships
World League Wrestling championships